jeen-yuhs: A Kanye Trilogy (or jeen-yuhs) is a 2022 American documentary film directed by Coodie & Chike about the life of American rapper, record producer, and fashion designer Kanye West and, to a lesser extent, Coodie Simmons.

Accolades
It received a nomination for Best Music Documentary at the 2022 MTV Movie & TV Awards and Outstanding Documentary or Nonfiction Series at the 74th Primetime Emmy Awards.

Production
On May 6, 2021, it was announced that Netflix had acquired a documentary about Kanye West with unreleased archival footage from the prior two decades, including his career in music and fashion, the death of his mother, Donda West, and his unsuccessful 2020 presidential campaign.

Variety reported Netflix acquired the documentary for around US$30 million. On September 25, 2021, Netflix revealed that the documentary would be titled Jeen-Yuhs and released in 2022.

Release
Divided into three acts, its first episode, "VISION", premiered at the 2022 Sundance Film Festival on January 23, 2022. It also had a limited theatrical release for one night only on February 10, 2022, the eighteenth anniversary of West's debut album The College Dropout (2004). "VISION" premiered on Netflix on February 16, 2022, and the following episodes, "PURPOSE" and "AWAKENING", released in weekly intervals, on February 23 and March 2, 2022, respectively.

Critical reception
Jeen-Yuhs was met with positive reception from critics. It holds a positive 82% critic score on Rotten Tomatoes based on 60 critics, and a "generally favorable" weighted mean score of 71 on Metacritic based on 24 critic reviews. The attention from the documentary caused West's debut album to re-chart on the Billboard 200, reaching as far up as #18.

References

External links
 
 
 

Netflix original documentary films
Kanye West
Documentary films about hip hop music and musicians
2020s English-language films